The Best of Nanci Griffith is a 1993 UK album release by Nanci Griffith. It is very similar to The MCA Years: A Retrospective but with several different tracks. Two of the tracks on The Best of Nanci Griffith had previously never been released on any album. The first of these, "Tumble And Fall", was later released on The Complete MCA Studio Recordings. The second previously unreleased song, "The Road To Aberdeen", was recorded live at The Royal Albert Hall in London in June 1993.

Track listing

References 

1993 greatest hits albums
Nanci Griffith compilation albums
MCA Records compilation albums